Ore Rektham (English: Same Blood) is a 1985 Indian Malayalam-language film,  directed by Sreekumaran Thampi. The film stars Ambareesh and Ambika. The film has musical score by Rajan Nagendra. The film was dubbed in Malayalam as Ore Raktham.

Cast
Ambareesh
Ambika

Soundtrack
The music was composed by Rajan Nagendra with lyrics by Chi. Udayashankar for the Kannada version and Sreekumaran Thampi for the Malayalam version.
Malayalam version

Kannada version (Onde Raktha)

References

External links
 

1985 films
1980s Kannada-language films
Films scored by Rajan–Nagendra
Films directed by Sreekumaran Thampi